Pedro Avilés Gutiérrez (Ceuta, 23 January 1956) is a Spanish novelist from Madrid.

Avilés was born in Ceuta, Spain where his father, Pedro, from Madrid, was following his military career in 1956. The mother of Pedro Aviles, Africa, was born in Ceuta though her family proceed from Tarifa, Cadiz. The family moved very soon to Madrid, when Pedro Avilés was three years old. For this reason Pedro considers himself to be from Madrid.

From his childhood, Avilés felt a very deep need to write so before beginning primary school he wrote a lot of stories. He initiated his primary school and university studies in Madrid. At twenty, he wrote his first novel, “Corpore Insepulto”, a play that "I never try to publish", say Pedro  Avilés. That was continued for another novel also unpublished; “La Inercia”.

Avilés began his professional activity as a war reporter. He covered the bread war in Morocco, the Sandinista war in Nicaragua, guerra de Nicaragua, and the Yugoslav Croatian war in 1991
Later he was dedicated to be a full crime reporter in several Spanish national media just like “El Caso” and the Interviú  magazine. He said he wrote 1,000 stories covering the most important issues of Spanish history between 1987 and 2006. He was responsible in “Tele Cinco” for a Unresolved Crime section between 1996 and 2000. Actually, some television Nets call him to offer his opinions about several criminal cases.

Nowadays, Avilés is fully dedicated to writing crime novels Las mariposas sobre la tumba and El whisky del muerto, are the first of a series of two starring a Crime Reporter that hates journalism. In his novels, Pedro Avilés he makes a very exact portrait and a terrible critic of the journalism world, an area he knows quite well. His long experience as a crime reporter gave him the right background for his writing.

Novels 

 Corpore Insepulto, 1976
 La Inercia, 1978
 Mata al presidente, 1986
 Las mariposas sobre la tumba, 2006
 El whisky del muerto, 2007
 Katoucha, Ediciones Libralia 2014

External links 
 Pedro Avilés Official Site
 Pedro Avilés in the Spanish Wikipedia

1956 births
Spanish novelists
Spanish male novelists
Living people
Writers from Madrid
People from Ceuta